WMLP (1380 AM) is a commercial AM radio station licensed to serve Milton, Pennsylvania. The station is owned by Michael Radio Company, LLC, who acquired it from Sunbury Broadcasting Corporation on February 21, 2020, and broadcasts a conservative talk radio format.

Translator

References

External links
 Official website

MLP
Talk radio stations in the United States
Radio stations established in 1955
1955 establishments in Pennsylvania